Robin Meloy Goldsby is an American pianist, composer, and memoirist.  Born in Pittsburgh, Pennsylvania, she is the daughter of drummer Bob Rawsthorne, who was one of the musicians on the PBS television show "Mister Rogers' Neighborhood." She attended Chatham College before moving to New York City in 1980. She started playing in piano bars during summers on Nantucket Island while working her way through Chatham College, and that eventually became her career.  She is married to bass player John Goldsby.  They have two children, Curtis Goldsby and Julia Goldsby.  They currently live in Germany.

Robin is the author of RHYTHM: A Novel, and Piano Girl: A Memoir. Her career as a musician has taken her from roadside dives to New York City's poshest venues, exclusive resorts, and on to the European castles where she now performs. Robin has three solo piano recordings to her name: Twilight, Somewhere in Time, and Songs from the Castle, and has appeared on NPR's All Things Considered and Piano Jazz with Marian McPartland.

Meloy also had a role as Jeanie, one of the seven doomed sorority sisters in Mark Rosman's 1983 cult slasher The House on Sorority Row. For the audition, in contrast with other actresses, Meloy wore a baggy T-shirt, glasses, and sweatpants to attain the role.

References
Piano Girl: Lessons in Life, Music, and the Perfect Blue Hawaiian by Robin Meloy Goldsby (Backbeat Books 2005)
Rhythm: A Novel by Robin Meloy Goldsby (Bass Lion Publications/BookSurge 2008,

External links
 Robin Goldsby's web page
 
 Interview with House on Sorority Row star Robin Meloy

American women composers
21st-century American composers
Living people
Year of birth missing (living people)
Musicians from Pittsburgh
Musicians from New York City
Chatham University alumni
21st-century American pianists
21st-century American women pianists
21st-century women composers
American women memoirists